"Mr. Radio" is a song recorded by the Electric Light Orchestra.

The song was the scheduled second single release from the band's debut album written by Jeff Lynne and is track number six on their 1971 debut album, The Electric Light Orchestra (No Answer in the US). The tune is written in a 1920s American style about a man whose wife has left him and his only companion is his radio.  The orchestral intro to the song is played backwards and is an early example of what would be Lynne's trademark ELO production style.

The beginning and the end of the number contains backwards samples of a Mozart symphony, and in the bridge section there is a distantly heard piece of backmasking, with Lynne singing, "Hello, Mr. Radio," which is flipped backwards and augmented with reverberation.

The single edit can be found on a 2005 compilation album, Harvest Showdown and on the Harvest Years 1970-1973 compilation. A remastered version would appear on the box set Flashback and later on remastered versions of their first album.

References

Song recordings produced by Jeff Lynne
Song recordings produced by Roy Wood
Electric Light Orchestra songs
1971 songs
Songs written by Jeff Lynne
Songs about radio